Gumercindo Yudis (13 January 1944 – 17 June 2015) was a Paraguayan footballer. He played in three matches for the Paraguay national football team in 1967. He was also part of Paraguay's squad for the 1967 South American Championship.

References

External links
 

1944 births
2015 deaths
Paraguayan footballers
Paraguay international footballers
Association football goalkeepers
People from Areguá